is a Japanese footballer currently playing for Yokohama FC.

Club statistics
.

Notes

References

External links

1998 births
Living people
Japanese footballers
Association football goalkeepers
J1 League players
J2 League players
J3 League players
Yokohama FC players
Gainare Tottori players